Blestemul pământului, blestemul iubirii (The curse of the land, the curse of love) is a 1981 Romanian drama film directed by Mircea Mureșan. The film is an adaptation of Liviu Rebreanu's 1920 social novel , starring Șerban Ionescu as the titular character, a poor Transylvanian peasant.

The movie was mostly shot in the village of Fântânele, near Sibiu, from 5 April 1978 to 9 February 1979. The release was delayed due to concerns raised by the communist censors. The premiere took place on 14 April 1980, at the Patria Cinema in Bucharest; the film was watched by 3,469,709 spectators in Romanian cinemas.

Cast
Șerban Ionescu – Ion
 – Vasile Baciu
Ioana Crăciunescu – Ana Baciu
Leopoldina Bălănuță – Zenobia
Octavian Cotescu – Zaharia Herdelea
 – Titu Herdelea
Tamara Buciuceanu – Maria Herdelea
Valentin Teodosiu – Gheorghe
Catrinel Dumitrescu – Laura
Ion Besoiu – Priest Belciug
 –	Lieutenant
 – Savista
 – Count
 – Ghighi
 – Dernstein
 – Innkeeper Avrum
Sorina Stănculescu – Florica
 – Protopope Pintea
Livia Baba – Wife of protopope Pintea
Ion Hidișan – Alexandru Pop-Glanetașu
 – Inspector
Radu Basarab – Doctor
Hans Pomarius – Beck
Teodor Portărescu – Mayor Florea Tancu
Nae Floca-Acileni – Simion Butunoiu
Mircea Hîndoreanu – Toma Bulbuc
Petre Lupu
Daniel Tomescu
Ferenc Fábián
Petre Gheorghiu – Goe, music teacher
Rodica Nițescu
Avram Besoiu – Marchidan
Mircea Cruceanu
Crina Cojocaru
Ion Porsila
Romulus Bărbulescu
Constantin Stănescu
Petre Vasilescu
Emilia Porojan
Paul Mocanu
Ion Grapinni
Stefan Erdös
Klaus Hinn
Conradt Kurt
Marieta Gaspar
Eugenia Barcan
Traian Dragoș

Dubbing
 – Wife of protopope Pintea
 – Beck
Jean Constantin – Protopope Pintea
Gheorghe Dănilă – Simion Butunoiu
 – Alexandru Pop-Glanetașu
Luminița Gheorghiu – Florica
 – Marchidan
Florin Zamfirescu – Toma Bulbuc

See also

References

1980 films
Romanian drama films
Films set in Transylvania
1980 drama films
Films based on works by Liviu Rebreanu
Films based on Romanian novels
Films directed by Mircea Mureşan